Isaac Begbie (4 June 1868 – 30 September 1958) was a Scottish footballer who played for Heart of Midlothian, Leith Athletic, Bathgate, Falkirk and the Scotland national team.

Born in Edinburgh, Begbie made his name with local club Hearts where he played right back and right half, and was captain in the successful team of the 1890s which won the Scottish Cup twice (1891 and 1896) and the Scottish Football League championship twice (1894–95 and 1896–97). During this decade he also won four caps for Scotland, plus three for the Scottish Football League XI.

Near the end of his career he played briefly for Leith Athletic, Bathgate and Falkirk.

References

External links

1868 births
Heart of Midlothian F.C. players
Scotland international footballers
Scottish Football League players
Scottish footballers
1958 deaths
Scottish Football League representative players
Leith Athletic F.C. players
Association football fullbacks
Association football wing halves
Footballers from Edinburgh
Bathgate F.C. players
Falkirk F.C. players